mwrank is one in a suite of programs for computing elliptic curves over rational numbers. Other programs in the suite compute conductors, torsion subgroups, isogenous and quadratic twists of curves. mwrank is written in C++ and is free software released under the GNU General Public License.

External links
Official mwrank website

Mathematical software